Las Caritas ("The faces") is a collection of Indian inscriptions in a rock formation looking out over Lake Enriquillo in the Dominican Republic. The place is also called the Trono de Enriquillo ("Enriquillo's throne") because it is said the Taíno leader Enriquillo used to camp here during his rebellion.

Pictures

References 
 Van Der Helm, Rien. Reis-handboek Dominicaanse Republiek (Dutch language, Elmar, 1991)

Dominican Republic culture
Pre-Columbian art
Petroglyphs in North America
Archaeological sites in the Dominican Republic